The Himalayan goral (Naemorhedus goral) or the gray goral, is a bovid species native to the Himalayas. It is listed as Near Threatened on the IUCN Red List because the population is thought to be declining significantly due to habitat loss and hunting for meat.

Characteristics

It has a gray or gray-brown coat with tan legs, lighter patches on its throat, and a single dark stripe along its spine. Males have short manes on their necks.
In addition to certain peculiarities in the form of the skull, gorals are chiefly distinguished from the closely related serows in that they do not possess preorbital glands below their eyes, nor corresponding depressions in their skulls.

Distribution and habitat
The Himalayan goral occurs in the Himalayas from Pakistan, Nepal, Bhutan, southern Tibet, and the states of Sikkim and Arunachal Pradesh in India to possibly western Myanmar.
In Pakistan, a minimum of 370–1017 Himalayan goral lived in seven isolated populations as of 2004.

Behaviour and ecology

Himalayan goral often form small bands of four to twelve individuals, although they are also known to pair off or, especially in the case of older males, be solitary. The animal is crepuscular, being most active in the early morning and late evening.  After a morning meal, it often drinks and then rests on a rock ledge through the day. It feeds on leaves and associated softer parts of plants, mainly grasses.
The Himalayan goral is very agile and can run quickly. Due to its coloration it is very well camouflaged, so that it is extremely difficult to sight it, especially since it spends much of the day lying still. However, it is hunted by various predators, notably the Himalayan wolf.

Himalayan goral can live for 14 or 15 years. The female gives birth after a gestation period of 170–218 days, usually to a single offspring. The young are weaned at 7 or 8 months of age and reach sexual maturity at around 3 years.

Conservation 
Naemorhedus goral is listed in CITES Appendix I.

References

Caprids
Fauna of the Himalayas
Mammals of Pakistan
Mammals of India
Mammals of Nepal
Mammals of Bhutan
Himalayan goral